Nabil Hemani (1 September 1979 – 12 June 2014) was an Algerian footballer. He played as a forward for several teams in the Algerian Ligue Professionnelle 1 and capped with Algeria at senior level.

Club career
On 12 July 2011 Hemani signed a one-year contract with JS Kabylie, returning to the club after three seasons with ES Sétif.

International career
In January 2008, he was called up by Rabah Saadane to the Algeria A' national team for a 5-day training camp.

On 25 May 2008 he was called up by Rabah Saadane to the Algerian National Team for a set of African Cup of Nations and World Cup qualifiers, replacing Kamel Ghilas on the team.

References

External links
 JS Kabylie Profile
 DZFoot Profile

1979 births
2014 deaths
Algerian footballers
Algeria international footballers
Kabyle people
JS Kabylie players
ES Sétif players
Footballers from Algiers
Algerian Ligue Professionnelle 1 players
OMR El Annasser players
CS Constantine players
Accidental deaths from falls
Accidental deaths in Algeria
Association football forwards
21st-century Algerian people